The Detroit Triple Fan Fair (DTFF) was a multigenre convention generally held annually in Detroit from 1965 to 1977. It is credited for being one of the first comic book conventions in the United States. The Triple Fan Fair also gave balanced coverage to historic film showings and science fiction literature, in a manner that provided a template for many future convention organizers — most of which have yet to attain the same level of equal service to this sort of linked fan base.

In addition to the typical convention features like a dealer room and panel-led discussions, the Detroit Triple Fan Fair featured a costume contest, and "films till dawn" (often running all night long for the convention's duration). From 1967 to at least 1969, the show presented the Nova Award to that year's guest of honor. In later years, the DTFF also sponsored an amateur film contest.

History 
On May 24, 1964, at the Hotel Tuller, teenagers Robert Brosch and Dave Szurek organized a Detroit-based convention for about 80 fans of the comic book medium. Jerry Bails, the "father of comics fandom," was on the organizing committee, along with members of the Michigan Science Fiction Society (the so-called "Misfits.")

The next year Bails and local comics enthusiast Shel Dorf took over the event, christening it the Detroit Triple Fan Fair (referring to fantasy literature, fantasy films, and comic art) and organizing it as an annual event (although no show was held in 1966). The board of the initial official Detroit Triple Fan Fair consisted of Bails, Carl Lundgren, Tom Altschuler, Ed Aprill, Noel Cooper, Gary Crowdus, Howard Devore, Marvin Giles, Dennis Kowicki, Larry Larson, and Eugene Seeger. Robert Brosch, an authority on horror films, also stayed involved with the DTFF in various capacities at least through 1970.

The first official DTFF took place July 24–25, 1965, at the Embassy Hotel in Detroit. Film showings included Lon Chaney's Phantom of the Opera and admission charge was $2.00 for both days.

In what soon became a trend, aspiring local comic book creators flocked to the early events, and often became involved with organizing the show each year. For instance, the then-18-year-old Carl Lundgren was co-chairman of the 1965 DTFF, and Rich Buckler also attended the initial shows as a teenager, eventually "running things." Arvell Jones recalls many members of the so-called "Detroit Mob" making appearances at various shows, including Buckler, Greg Theakston, Tom Orzechowski, Keith Pollard, Jim Starlin, Mike Vosburg, Al Milgrom, Terry Austin, and Michael Netzer (Nasser). The reputation of the convention was such that a number of other industry professionals would appear at the event unbilled.

Among the films screened at the 1969 show were the Boris Karloff films The Mummy, Frankenstein, and The Bells. Letterer Ken Bruzenak attended the 1969 convention, where he met his hero Jim Steranko, and also crossed paths with future collaborator Howard Chaykin for the first time.

Co-founder Dorf left Detroit and the DTFF for Southern California in late 1969, where he shortly founded what became the San Diego Comic-Con.

The 1970 show, organized by Buckler and DTFF originator Robert Brosch, expanded to a five-day affair that shared events with "Dum-Dum '70" (put on by Burroughs' Bibliophiles). Guests and attending professionals included Philip José Farmer (the Dum-Dum Guest of Honor), Jim Steranko, Algis Budrys, Don & Maggie Thompson, Jerry Bails, Marv Wolfman, Len Wein, Bernie Wrightson, Alan Weiss, Mike Friedrich, and John Jakes. Panels were held on such topics as Carl Barks & Walt Kelly, the future of comics, and a "sword & sorcery symposium."  The Academy of Comic Book Arts provided an exhibit of original art. The dealer room was known as the "Huckster Room" and "movies till dawn" were shown every night from Sept. 3–6. A masquerade ball, with prizes for the best costume, was held Saturday night. In addition to co-organizer Buckler, other attendees at the 1970 DTFF who later became comics industry professionals included Arvell Jones, Tom Orzechowski, Greg Theakston, and Tony Isabella.

No DTFF was held in 1971, and Detroit-area enthusiasts Tom Orzechowski, Terry Austin, Tony Isabella, Arvell Jones, Martin Pasko, and Jerry Bails feared it would fade away entirely. Accordingly, in August 1972 they organized the Detroit Tri-Con, held August 3–6 at the Pick-Fort Shelby Hotel. Official guests were Gray Morrow, Lin Carter, and Fan Guest of Honor Rick Yager; other guests included Edmond Hamilton, Leigh Brackett, Al Williamson, Russ Myers, John Jakes, T. Casey Brennan, and Robert Taylor; the program cover was by Gray Morrow. Films included Fritz Lang's Metropolis, Douglas Fairbanks' The Thief of Bagdad, Arthur Conan Doyle's The Lost World, and Humphrey Bogart's The Maltese Falcon.

Greg Theakston became a major player in the DTFF after Shel Dorf left, coming to own it from 1973 until its 1978 dissolution. In response to the Detroit Tri-Con, and asserting that the Triple Fan Fair was "alive and well," Theakston staged a DTFF from October 19–22, 1972. That year's show shared billing with Al Schuster's Star Trek Convention; guests included Gene Roddenberry and Majel Barrett, as well as Neal Adams.  "Films till dawn" shown at the 1972 DTFF included such Pre-Code Hollywood classics as The Invisible Man, Bela Lugosi's Dracula, and Boris Karloff's Frankenstein and Bride of Frankenstein; a selection of Hammer Horror films; an uncut version of Night of the Living Dead; four Marx Brothers films;  and 12 Star Trek episodes. In addition, Vaughn Bodē debuted his "Bodē Cartoon Concert" at the 1972 show, in front of a crowd of 80 people. Admission each day to the 1972 DTFF was $4 at the door. (Illustrator Joe Barney — who later worked for Neal Adams' Continuity Studios — claims to have met his idol Jim Steranko at the 1971 Detroit Triple Fan Fair, but there is no record of a DTFF being held in 1971. Barney remembers Vaughn Bodē, Jeff Jones, Greg Theakston, Michael Nasser, and Keith Pollard being at the same show, which means he was probably thinking of the 1972 edition of DTFF.)

One of Theakston's first acts as official DTFF owner was to hold two shows in 1973, one over Memorial Day weekend, and one in October. "Films all night" from the May show included seven Marx Brothers movies and the Pre-Code Hollywood films Mad Love and Mystery of the Wax Museum. Chuck Rozanski, later a major Denver-area comics retailer, hitchhiked to Detroit for the Memorial Day DTFF, slept in Jerry Bails' home, and set up as a dealer at the show. Rozanski converted 50 high-value comics he brought with him into an inventory of more than 2,000 comics. By the end of the show, he had made more than $400 and had over 1000 comics which he sent back to Denver for future sales. (Rozanski opened his first store in Denver the following year.)

The October 1973 show, featuring Barry Smith, Michael Kaluta, George A. Romero, and Russ Heath, sponsored an amateur film contest and the annual "masque" (with a $100 first prize). "Films till dawn" included two Marx Brothers films, 20 Warner Bros. cartoons, and six Amos 'n' Andy episodes.

In 1974, DTFF was considered the largest fan convention, in terms of attendance, in the Midwest. The 1974 edition featured an Academy of Comic Book Arts exhibit, an amateur film contest, and the annual "masque" with a $150 first prize. Thursday night's "films till dawn" and "fractured flickers" included six Amos 'n' Andy episodes. Artist Michael Netzer (then known as Michael Nasser) remembers that Greg Theakston introduced him to Neal Adams at the 1974 DTFF. Adams took interest in Netzer's art and invited him to join Continuity Studios.

By the mid-to-late 1970s, many of the Detroit-area creators who had helped organize the show had relocated to New York City to work for Marvel and DC. The DTFF would continue sporadically through the 1970s. There was no DTFF held in 1975. In 1977, there was a final Triple Fan Fair held at the now-defunct Hilton in Troy, Michigan — that edition of the DTFF was known as the "Detroit Triple Fan Fair (in Exile)." Guests of honor at that event were Chuck Jones, Charles H. Schneer, and Ray Harryhausen. Films screened at the 1977 DTFF included the Harryhausen movies It Came from Beneath the Sea, The 7th Voyage of Sinbad, and Sinbad and the Eye of the Tiger.

Comic book artist Gray Morrow claimed to have illustrated the 1978 DTFF program booklet, but there is no record of a show being held that year.

Legacy 
From 1984 to 1986, local-area grad student Gary Reed (later publisher of Caliber Press) ran a local convention known as King Kon. Starting in 1989, comics retailer Michael Goldman launched a for-profit endeavor called the Motor City Comic Con; it continues as an annual show to the present day.

The Detroit Fanfare, established in 2010, openly acknowledged its debt to the Detroit Triple Fan Fair:

In another nod to the DTFF, the Detroit Fanfare also distributed the "Shel Dorf Awards". The Detroit Fanfare ceased operations after the 2012 convention.

Dates and locations

Nova Awards 
The Nova Award was created by Jack Promo and Marvin S. Giles, and was first presented in 1967.
 1967 Roger Zelazny — "in recognition of outstanding contribution to science fiction and fantasy"
 1968 Harlan Ellison
 1969 Al Williamson — "in recognition of his achievements in illustrative art"

Program booklets 
 1965 DTFF #1 program cover designed by Shel Dorf
 1967 DTFF #2 program cover used Jack Kirby art from the cover of Fantastic Four Annual #3 [marriage of Sue and Reed issue]
 1968 DTFF #3 program cover by Rich Buckler depicting Flash Gordon as drawn by Reed Crandall
 1969 DTFF #4 program cover by Jack Kirby in pencil depicting Loki and two other denizens of Asgard
 1970 DTFF #5 program cover by Jim Steranko, and interior art pages by Neal Adams and Bernie Wrightson. The program booklet was dedicated to Jack Kirby.
 1972 May DTFF #6 program cover by Russ Heath
 1972 October DTFF #7 program cover by Neal Adams, featuring Batman, Deadman, Green Lantern, Green Arrow, and the Starship Enterprise
 1973 May DTFF #8 
 1973 October DTFF #9 program cover illustration of Conan by Barry Windsor-Smith
 1974 DTFF #10 program cover illustration of The Spirit by Will Eisner
 1976 DTFF #11 program cover by Joe Kubert of Tarzan
 1977 May DTFF #12 program cover by artwork depicting Troglodyte from Ray Harryhausen's Sinbad and the Eye of the Tiger
 1977 October DTFF #13 program cover by Chuck Jones, billed as "Detroit Triple Fan Fair 13"

Progress reports 
The DTFF published "progress reports" in 1969, 1970, 1972, 1973, 1974, as many as three for some of their conventions. Contributors included Allen Park and Robert Brosch; cover illustrations were by Al Williamson, Frank Frazetta, and Neal Adams (Batman).

See also 

 List of defunct comic book conventions

References

External links 
 Fan page dedicated to the show

Defunct comics conventions
Defunct multigenre conventions
Defunct fan conventions
Recurring events established in 1965
Tourist attractions in Detroit
Conventions in Michigan
Culture of Detroit